The Mycetoma Research Center was established in 1991 under the umbrella of the University of Khartoum. It was set up at Soba University Hospital to provide medical care for mycetoma patients, research and education and teaching in the various aspects of mycetoma.

Mycetoma is a common health problem, endemic in many tropical and subtropical regions and reported throughout the globe.

Staff

The staff members are of medical, health and science backgrounds; they are interested in all facets related to Mycetoma and have good track records in patients’ management, teaching, research and community development. Through clinical and basic research, the staff of the center has continually explored new approaches to patients’ management.

Research Programmes

The research programmes and projects carried out in the Center are of a multidisciplinary approach focusing on basic research into the causes and progression of Mycetoma, the translation of new knowledge and technology into novel treatments and the provision of patient care.

References

External links
Mycetoma Research Center Homepage
 The Neglected Tropical Diseases Department /WHO
 Prof. Ahmed Hassan Fahal

Parasitology research
Research institutes in Sudan
Medical research institutes
Medical and health organisations based in Sudan
University of Khartoum
Khartoum